It's All Happening is the debut full-length album by Iwrestledabearonce. It was released on June 2, 2009 through Century Media Records.

Background
Iwrestledabearonce wrote and recorded It's All Happening within the course of 2008 through 2009 upon their signing to Century Media. Upon its release on June 2, 2009, it sold 4,300 copies in the United States in its first week of release to debut at position No. 121 on The Billboard 200 chart. The album landed at position No. 1 on the Top New Artist Albums (Heatseekers) chart.

On June 29, 2010, the band re-released It's All Happening as a 3-disc special edition that includes the regular album, a remix album entitled "It's All Remixed!", and a DVD. This special edition also includes song stems to allow fans to create their own remixes.

Several songs have titles related to various cartoons. For example, the song title "I'm Cold And There Are Wolves After Me" is a quote from The Simpsons episode "Cape Feare", the second episode from their fifth season.

Reception 

The album generally received mixed to positive reviews. Ultimate Guitar commented by saying "Iwrestledabearonce are one of the strangest yet most unique bands out there today, and It's All Happening displays their style superbly. There are also random things thrown into songs, whether it's the famous 'Dixie' carhorn from The Dukes of Hazzard or the hillbilly sounding section in 'You Ain't No Family'. Besides their obvious random and strange sections, other sections display superior musicianship showing their ability to flawlessly change styles and switch sections." However, Phil Freeman of Allmusic commented on the album, stating "The band's grindcore parts are precise and mechanistic, but indistinguishable from those of 100 or more other bands; it's only when they leap into an electro-disco interlude, or start going jazz-prog for no reason, that one's attention is piqued, and even then it's not necessarily a good thing."

Both the first and fifth track, "You Ain't No Family" and "Tastes Like Kevin Bacon", were featured in the game Rock Band 2 as downloadable content via the Rock Band Network.

Track listing

Personnel 
 Iwrestledabearonce
 Steven Bradley – guitars, keyboards, samples
 Dave Branch – bass
 Krysta Cameron – vocals
 John Ganey – guitars, keyboards, samples
 Mikey Montgomery – drums, backing vocals
Production
Programming by John Ganey and Steven Bradley
Artwork by Sons of Nero

Charts

References

2009 debut albums
Century Media Records albums
Iwrestledabearonce albums
Albums with cover art by Sons of Nero